Brunei and Singapore established diplomatic relations in 1984. Brunei has a high commission in Singapore, and Singapore has a high commission in Bandar Seri Begawan. Brunei and Singapore have close and friendly relations with extensive defence co-operation. Both countries are members of ASEAN and Commonwealth of Nations.

History 
The official relations between the two countries were established in 1984. In 2012, His Majesty the Sultan of Brunei Hassanal Bolkiah attended the 3rd Singapore Airshow and met the current Prime Minister Lee Hsien Loong and the former Prime Minister Lee Kuan Yew, while Teo Chee Hean visited Brunei the same year.

Economic and monetary relations 
Several memorandum of understanding have been signed and there is a Currency Interchangeability Agreement between the two countries which makes both Brunei dollar and Singapore dollar banknotes and coins legal tender in either country.

Security relations 
The Singapore Armed Forces (SAF) has trained many Bruneian soldiers for a period of time. As compensation, Brunei granted the Singapore Armed Forces to build a permanent jungle training camp in Temburong, named Lakiun Camp and officially opened in 1977. Brunei and Singapore began Exercise Airguard in 1994, which involves joint training between the Royal Brunei Air Force and the Republic of Singapore Air Force, with the states alternating as hosts. The exercises usually involve around 70 personnel from both nations.

Further reading 
 Presidential Visit Reaffirms Strong Ties between Brunei and Singapore Naval Today
 DPM Teo visits Brunei in effort to strengthen relations asiaone
 Minister attends 7th Brunei, Singapore annual exchange of visit The Borneo Post

References 

 
Singapore
Bilateral relations of Singapore
Singapore
Brunei